The 2019 Paris Eternal season was the first season of Paris Eternal's existence in the Overwatch League. The team was one of eight expansion franchises added for the 2019 season. After the team posted a 3–4 record in Stage 1, head coach Julien Ducros left the team and was replaced by Félix Münch. Paris ended the season with a disappointing 11–17 record, did not manage to yield a winning record in any stage, and did not qualify for any of the stage playoffs nor the season playoffs.

Preceding offseason 
On 23 October, Eternal announced their entirely European roster, consisting of the following players:

Karol "danye" Szcześniak, 
Nicolas "NiCOgdh" Moret, 
Georgii "ShaDowBurn" Gushcha, 
Terrence "SoOn" Tarlier, 
Finnbjorn "Finnsi" Jonasson, 
Benjamin "BenBest" Dieulafait, 
Roni "LhCloudy" Tiihonen, 
Damien "HyP" Souville, and 
Harrison "Kruise" Pond.

On 8 November, Eternal revealed their entirely European coaching staff. On 28 November, Eternal signed support player Luís "Greyy" Perestrelo.

Regular season 
Eternal's first-ever Overwatch League match was against the 2018 Overwatch League Grand Finals champions London Spitfire on 16 February; Paris won the match 3–1. The team finished Stage 1 with a 3–4 record and did not qualify for the Stage 1 playoffs.

Two days before Stage 2 began, head coach Julien "daemoN" Ducros stepped down from his position. He was replaced the next day, as the Eternal promoted player development coach Félix "Féfé" Münch to head coach. In week four, Paris traveled to the Allen Event Center in Allen, Texas for the Dallas Fuel Homestand Weekend. The team first took on the London Spitfire in a rematch of their season opener on 20 April, which was delayed by an hour-long power outage. Paris swept by the Spitfire 0–4. The team finished the stage with a 2–5 record.

On 17 August, the Eternal defeated the Stage 3 Champions Shanghai Dragons; however, the Los Angeles Valiant won their match later that day, which officially eliminated the Eternal from qualifying for the postseason. The team closed out their season with a match against the Washington Justice a day later. In a match that had no playoff implications for either team, Paris lost 1–3, finishing their season with a 11–17 record.

Final roster

Standings

Record by stage

League

Game log

Awards 
On 8 May, Harrison "Kruise" Pond was named as a reserve for the 2019 Overwatch League All-Star Game.

References 

2019 Overwatch League seasons by team
Paris Eternal
Paris Eternal seasons